Arlene Aikenhead is a Canadian Paralympic equestrian and boccia player from Alberta.

She competed in the 1984 Summer Paralympics and won silver in mixed dressage, Elementary walk C1-2, and bronze in Obstacle course - Walk C1-3.

References

External links 
 

Living people
Canadian female equestrians
Paralympic equestrians of Canada
Paralympic silver medalists for Canada
Paralympic bronze medalists for Canada
Paralympic medalists in equestrian
Equestrians at the 1984 Summer Paralympics
Medalists at the 1984 Summer Paralympics
Year of birth missing (living people)
Place of birth missing (living people)